Daniele Bracciali and František Čermák were the defending champions but Bracciali decided not to participate here, instead of 2012 Aegon International.
Čermák played alongside Filip Polášek but lost in the Quarterfinals.
Robert Lindstedt and Horia Tecău won the title by beating Juan Sebastián Cabal and Dmitry Tursunov 6–3, 7–6(7–1) in the final.

Seeds

Draw

Draw

References
 Main Draw

UNICEF Open - Doubles
2012 Men's Doubles